The Aiguille Croche is a mountain in the Beaufortain Massif in Savoie and Haute-Savoie, France. In 2009, Matthias Giraud was the first person to descent and ski BASE jump off its cliff face.

Mountains of the Graian Alps
Mountains of Savoie
Mountains of Haute-Savoie